The Kerala Sahitya Akademi Award for Drama is an award given every year by the Kerala Sahitya Akademi (Kerala Literary Academy) to Malayalam writers for writing a drama of literary merit. It is one of the twelve categories of the Kerala Sahitya Akademi Award.

Awardees

References

Awards established in 1958
Kerala Sahitya Akademi Awards
Malayalam literary awards
Dramatist and playwright awards
1958 establishments in Kerala